Virginia's 34th Senate district is one of 40 districts in the Senate of Virginia. It has been represented by Democrat Chap Petersen since his 2007 defeat of Republican incumbent Jeannemarie Devolites Davis.

Geography
District 34 includes all of the City of Fairfax and parts of Fairfax County in the suburbs of Washington, D.C., including some or all of Vienna, Dunn Loring, Merrifield, Oakton, Fair Oaks, Chantilly, and Centreville.

The district overlaps with Virginia's 10th and 11th congressional districts, and with the 35th, 37th, 39th, 40th, 41st, 53rd, and 67th districts of the Virginia House of Delegates.

Recent election results

2019

2015

2011

Federal and statewide results in District 34

Historical results
All election results below took place prior to 2011 redistricting, and thus were under different district lines.

2007

2003

1999

1995

References

Virginia Senate districts
Fairfax, Virginia
Government in Fairfax County, Virginia